The following tables show state-by-state results in the Australian Senate at the 2001 federal election. Senators total 35 coalition (31 Liberal, three National, one CLP), 28 Labor, two Green, eight Democrats, two Independents and one One Nation. Senator terms are six years (three for territories), and took their seats from 1 July 2002, except the territories who took their seats immediately.

Australia

New South Wales

Victoria

Queensland

Western Australia

South Australia

Tasmania

Territories

Australian Capital Territory

Northern Territory

See also 
 Candidates of the 2001 Australian federal election
 Members of the Australian Senate, 2002–2005

Notes

References

2001 elections in Australia
Senate 2001
Australian Senate elections